Ghulam Hassan Pinglana (d. 9 April 1996) was an Indian politician who was assassinated by unknown gunman in his home village of Pinglana, Pulwama district, Jammu and Kashmir.

Born in Pinglana(1939), he started his career as a leader of Shahoora agitation against government's apathy towards the Shahoora region. He was later on elected to Jammu and Kashmir Legislative Council under an agreement reached between Shahoora agitation committee and then prime minister Bakshi Ghulam Mohammad. In 1980 he was elected  District President of the Jammu and Kashmir Pradesh Congress Committee (JKPCC).  He was later promoted and remained vice President of the JKPCC .In 1989 he resigned from congress and was believed to have come closer to pro freedom Jamat Islami. From 1990 to 1995 he was arrested twice by Indian security forces for his alleged links with Jamat Islami. He served as a Member of the Legislative Council (MLC) and as a parliamentarian in the Indian National Congress.

He was assassinated at his home in a wave of pre-election violence by an unknown gunman.  Amnesty International reported that he was killed "allegedly by the Hizbul Mujahideen."However most of the militant organisations including Hizbul Mujahideen have accused pro-Indian renegate militants for his murder"
Mr. Mir was a popular politician and people considered him very helpful. He is being remembered for his efforts to get potable drinking water, roads, electricity, schools and jobs to his constituency in pulwama. He has served on board of directors of Jammu and kashmir Khadi and village Industries & Jammu and Kashmir Land Development Bank. He also was chairman of Khadi sang and a member of Indian good will mission to Saudi Arabia in 1989. His murder has not been investigated by the state police department and no final report has been submitted.

References 

Year of birth missing
1996 deaths
1996 murders in India
Indian murder victims
Deaths by firearm in India
People murdered in Jammu and Kashmir
People from Pulwama district
Members of the Jammu and Kashmir Legislative Council
Indian National Congress politicians